Dolphin Scholarship Foundation (DSF) was established in 1960 to assist children of the U.S. Submarine Force with college scholarships through private fundraising and donations, as well as any dividends from its trust fund.

The first scholarship of $350 was awarded to John L. Haines, Jr. in June 1961. Funds were raised primarily through the tireless efforts of submarine officers' wives' organizations throughout the United States. As the cost of college education continued to skyrocket, so did the need for the Foundation to assist children of Submariners. Today DSF receives individual, corporate, memorial and Combined Federal Campaign donations, as well as continued strong support from the submarine community and spouse organizations. Donations go directly to support scholarships; income from DSF investments supplement these contributions for scholarships and operating expenses. Dolphin Scholarship Foundation also conducts fundraisers such as the Annual Cartoon Calendar (since 1963), the Annual Golf Tournament in Hampton Roads, Virginia (since 2006) and virtual submarine races.  
 
Dolphin Scholarship Foundation currently awards 137 annual scholarships of $3,400 to each Dolphin Scholar. Each recipient may potentially receive a total of $13,600 for up to eight semesters of undergraduate study. The number of new awards granted each year is determined by graduation and attrition of current Dolphin Scholars. Dolphin Scholarship Foundation is proud to have awarded over eight million dollars to over 1000 students attending universities and colleges through the United States.

References

External links
 Official Web Site

Scholarships in the United States
Educational foundations in the United States